The 2020 Sibiu Cycling Tour was a men's road bicycle race which took place from 23 to 26 July 2020 in and around the city of Sibiu, Romania. The race was a 2.1-rated event as part of the 2020 UCI Europe Tour and is made up of five stages. This race was the 10th edition of the Sibiu Cycling Tour.

Teams
Twenty-two teams participated in the race, including two UCI WorldTeams, three UCI ProTeams, sixteen UCI Continental teams, and one national team.

UCI WorldTeams

 
 

UCI ProTeams

 
 
 

UCI Continental Teams

 
 
 
 
 
 
 
 
 
 
 
 
 
 
 
 

National Teams

 Romania

Route

Stages

Prologue
23 July 2020 – Sibiu to Sibiu,  (ITT)

Stage 1
24 July 2020 – Sibiu to Bâlea Lac,

Stage 2
25 July 2020 – Sibiu to Sibiu,

Stage 3a
26 July 2020 – Curmătura Ștezii to Arena Platos,  (ITT)

Stage 3b
26 July 2020 – Sibiu to Sibiu,

Classification leadership

Final classification standings

General classification

Points classification

Mountains classification

Young rider classification

Team classification

Sprints classification

Romanian rider classification

References

External links

2020 UCI Europe Tour
July 2020 sports events in Romania